Alexa Mezincescu (b.07.03 1936–20.06.2019) is a Romanian ballet dancer and choreographer.

Mezincescu trained at the Bucharest Choreography School, and was subsequently sent to train in Leningrad. She was a principal soloist with the Romanian National Opera, where she was noted for her interpretations of Bruckner.

She was granted the National Order of Faithful Service by Ion Iliescu.

References

1936 births
Living people
Romanian ballerinas
Romanian choreographers